Ujan Mas is a district (kecamatan) of Kepahiang Regency, Bengkulu, Indonesia.

Subdistricts 
 Ujan Mas
 Air Hitam 
 Bumi Sari 
 Cugung Lalang 
 Daspetah 
 Daspetah II 
 Meranti Jaya 
 Pekalongan 
 Pungguk Beringang 
 Punggung Meranti 
 Suro Bali 
 Suro Baru 
 Suro Ilir 
 Suro Lembak 
 Suro Muncar 
 Tanjung Alam 
 Ujan Mas Bawah

Districts of Kepahiang Regency